Manoj Sood (born May 5, 1962) is a Canadian film and television actor.

Life and career 
Manoj Sood was born in Mombasa, Kenya, to Indian Hindu parents, Dr. B.K. Sood and Narindar Sood.

He immigrated with his family to Canada in 1964, and grew up in Calgary, Alberta.

Sood entered the entertainment world in 1995, when executive producers, Billy Crystal and Francis Ford Copolla cast Manoj in their film, Survival On The Mountain  Since then, Sood has been a regular performer in television and feature film productions and has worked all over the world .

Most notably, he portrayed the leading role of conservative Muslim father, Baber Siddiqui in the popular CBC/Amazon Prime sitcom Little Mosque on the Prairie, which aired for six seasons. Other television appearances include Da Vinci's Inquest, The Dead Zone, Romeo! and Dead Like Me and feature films such as Romeo Must Die, Rat Race, Meltdown, and Watchmen.

Sood's recent credits include appearances in the television series, Snowpiercer, the Netflix hit, Wedding Season, and Bob Odenkirk's new show, Lucky Hank. Manoj lives in the greater Vancouver area of BC, Canada and is represented by, The Characters Talent Agency.

Personal life 
Sood is the brother of actress Veena Sood and the cousin of musician Ashwin Sood. Manoj Sood has a son, Kama L. Sood who is a filmmaker.

Sood has been an avid fly fisherman since he was a child and is also a passionate amateur astronomer.  He has spoken out against the sexual exploitation of children at home and abroad for the advocacy group Beyond Borders.

Filmography

References

External links 
 Manoj Sood Official Site
 

1962 births
Living people
Canadian male film actors
Canadian male television actors
Canadian Hindus
People from Mombasa
Kenyan people of Indian descent
Kenyan emigrants to Canada
Male actors from Calgary
Canadian people of Punjabi descent
Canadian male actors of Indian descent